This is a list of members of the 52nd Legislative Assembly of Queensland from 2006 to 2009, as elected at the 2006 election held on 9 September 2006.

 On 13 September 2007, the Labor member for Brisbane Central and Premier, Peter Beattie, resigned. Labor candidate Grace Grace won the resulting by-election on 13 October 2007.
 The opposition Liberal and National parties merged to create the Liberal National Party of Queensland on 27 July 2008.
 On 5 October 2008, the member for Indooroopilly, Ronan Lee, resigned from the Labor Party and joined the Queensland Greens, becoming their first ever member of parliament in the state.

See also
2006 Queensland state election
Beattie Ministry (Labor) (1998–2007)
Bligh Ministry (Labor) (2007–present)

References

Members of Queensland parliaments by term
21st-century Australian politicians